Old Drawyers Church is a historic Presbyterian church on U.S. 13 near Odessa, New Castle County, Delaware.  The congregation was founded by Dutch and Swedish immigrants, though by the time the church was built the congregation was largely made up of Scottish immigrants.

It was built between 1769 and 1773, and is a two-story, five bay brick building in the Georgian style. It features an elaborate Georgian doorway and gable roof.  The interior features an ornate soundingboard, suspended over the open pulpit.

It was listed on the National Register of Historic Places in 1973.

References

External links

Historic American Buildings Survey in Delaware
Presbyterian churches in Delaware
Churches on the National Register of Historic Places in Delaware
Georgian architecture in Delaware
Churches completed in 1773
Churches in New Castle County, Delaware
Dutch-American culture in Delaware
Scottish-American history
Swedish-American culture in Delaware
National Register of Historic Places in New Castle County, Delaware
18th-century Presbyterian church buildings in the United States